Aimar Moratalla Botifoll (born 11 January 1987), known simply as Aimar, is a Spanish professional footballer who plays for Olot. Mainly a right back, he can also play as a central defender or defensive midfielder.

Club career
Born in Sant Antoni de Vilamajor, Barcelona, Catalonia, Aimar made his senior debut with EC Granollers in the regional leagues on 29 October 2006, starting in a 1–0 away win against UE Cornellà. He signed with fellow league team CF Peralada in 2007, and joined Tercera División side CD Banyoles in July 2008.

In the summer of 2009, Aimar moved to UE Llagostera, freshly promoted to the fourth level. In 2011, after the club's promotion to Segunda División B, he renewed his contract, but struggled to appear regularly due to a pubalgia.

Aimar featured sparingly during the 2013–14 season, as Llagostera were promoted to Segunda División for the first time ever. He played his first match as a professional on 23 August 2014, starting in a 0–2 away loss to UD Las Palmas; he scored his first goal in the competition on 7 February of the following year, netting the game's only in a home victory over Recreativo de Huelva.

On 27 January 2022, Aimar signed with Tercera Federación club Olot. He won promotion to the Segunda Federación during his first season at the club.

Notes

References

External links

1987 births
Living people
People from Vallès Oriental
Sportspeople from the Province of Barcelona
Spanish footballers
Footballers from Catalonia
Association football defenders
Association football midfielders
Association football utility players
Segunda División players
Segunda División B players
Tercera División players
EC Granollers players
CF Peralada players
UE Costa Brava players
UE Cornellà players
CE Europa footballers
CF Damm players
UE Olot players
Veikkausliiga players
Seinäjoen Jalkapallokerho players
Spanish expatriate footballers
Expatriate footballers in Finland
Spanish expatriate sportspeople in Finland